V. Balakrishnan may refer to:
V. Balakrishnan (author) (1932–2004), Malayalam writer and translator
V. Balakrishnan (physicist) (born 1943), Indian theoretical physicist
V. Balakrishnan (politician) (1939–2020), Indian politician

See also
Balakrishna (name)